Denisovskaya is a rural locality (a village) in Shelotskoye Rural Settlement, Verkhovazhsky District, Vologda Oblast, Russia. The population was 63 as of 2002.

Geography 
Denisovskaya is located 59 km southwest of Verkhovazhye (the district's administrative centre) by road. Garmanovo is the nearest rural locality.

References 

Rural localities in Verkhovazhsky District